Metropolitan Correctional Center is the name of several federal prisons in the United States:

Metropolitan Correctional Center, Chicago
Metropolitan Correctional Center, New York City
Metropolitan Correctional Center, San Diego